Santiago Trigos Nava (born 22 January 2002) is a Mexican professional footballer who plays as a defensive midfielder for Liga MX club UNAM.

Career statistics

Club

References

External links
 
 
 

Living people
2002 births
Mexican footballers
Association football midfielders
Club Universidad Nacional footballers
Liga de Expansión MX players
Liga MX players
Footballers from Mexico City